In mathematics, Mittag-Leffler summation is any of several variations of the Borel summation method for summing possibly divergent formal power series, introduced by

Definition

Let

be a formal power series in z.

Then the Mittag-Leffler sum of y is given by

if each sum converges and the limit exists.

A closely related summation method, also called Mittag-Leffler summation, is given as follows .
Suppose that the Borel transform  converges to an analytic function near 0 that can be analytically continued along the positive real axis to a function growing sufficiently slowly that the following integral is well defined (as an improper integral).  Then the Mittag-Leffler sum of y is given by

When α = 1 this is the same as Borel summation.

See also

 Mittag-Leffler distribution
 Mittag-Leffler function
 Nachbin's theorem

References

Summability methods